Blan may refer to:

People
 Albert Blan (1930–2015), English rugby league football player
 Billy Blan (1922–2008), English rugby league football player
 Sidney Herbert Blan, American politician

Fictional characters
 Lillet Blan, character in GrimGrimoire
 Mashiro Blan, character in My-HiME

Places
 Blan, Tarn, France